USS Serapis may refer to the following ships operated by the United States Navy:

 Serapis, was a British frigate known as  captured by John Paul Jones and the crew of Bonhomme Richard in 1779. She was later sold to France.
 , was a steam sloop, authorized in 1864 but never fully completed
 , was a single-screw tanker built in 1921 and originally named District of Columbia.

United States Navy ship names